Otto Brahm (born Otto Abrahamsohn on 5 February 1856 in Hamburg; died 28 November 1912 in Berlin) was a German drama and literary critic, theatre manager and director. His productions were noted for being accurate and realistic. He was involved in the foundation of the progressive Die Freie Bühne (English: Free Stage) company, of which he became president and producer. He also edited the company's weekly magazine of the same name, but later changed its name to Die neue Rundschau.

Brahm also managed the Deutsches Theater in Berlin, and was responsible for modernising its output.

From Heinz Herald's memoir of Max Reinhardt entitled Bildnis Eines Theater-Mannes, regarding the birth of modern theatre: 
In Germany, the explosion came in 1889, embodied by Otto Brahm. Her place was the newly grounded vacant stage, her occasion is the premiere of a young unknown poet. His name was Gerhart Hauptmann, his play Before Sunrise. Opinions collapsed, as the representatives of a tradition-bound art calcified with the glowing, indomitable, new style. A well-known Berlin doctor swung a symbolic and a little rude noose after the curtain had fallen. A battle raged, but soon it became clear as day that naturalism had triumphed here on the whole line.

The confirmation of this victory occurred when Brahm shortly afterwards took over the direction of the Deutsches Theater, which at that time was still considered to be the leader in Berlin and the Reich. But even Otto Brahm could not fulfill the theoretical ideal of consistent naturalism because it was and is unfulfillable. . . . Art, even naturalistic art, is a choice, omission. The verdict that was literally painted on Brahm’s stage, "art and nature are one only," could not be realized.

Brahm saw this too soon. His house-poets, led by Ibsen and Hauptmann, supplied him with pieces that one could by no means call naturalistic. They used more naturalistic means, but they also omitted and increased. . . . . [However] there was no longer a stilted language, no idealized decoration, no off-the-ground stage style. The Brahms theater was true, honest, decent, manly. One did not pretend in Brahm’s theatre, one played as lifelike as possible. A great ensemble helped Otto Brahm with this effort. Every time an elementary new stage personality appears, a keen actor seems to form itself around this center. Here were the best Rittner, Sauer, Hermann Muller, Bassermann and Else Lehmann: performers who met exactly the Brahmian style of the naturalness, truthfulness, sober behavior. Through hotly controversial Hauptmann's first performances and many pieces of the naturalistic period, Brahm and his cast rose to what they undoubtedly considered to be the pinnacle of their achievement: the peculiar and pompous cycle of Ibsen.

[However], Brahm was not a director. This position, which is unknown in our current sense, was more the role of a subaltern. Brahm sat in on the rehearsals in the dark auditorium and tried to bring his actors to where he wanted them by talking after rehearsing. He was a brilliant dramaturg. He was in close contact with his authors, selected the pieces for his playing schedule, occupied them, found and hired new ensemble members. A young actor of his theater, who had noticed him on a short visit to Salzburg and stayed with him for almost a decade, was called Max Reinhardt.” 12-14

See also
 Oskar Seidlin

External links
 Jewish Encyclopedia

1856 births
1912 deaths
19th-century theatre
19th-century German Jews
German literary critics
German theatre directors
German theatre managers and producers
Writers from Hamburg
German male non-fiction writers
German magazine founders